The Boston Whaler-class lifeboat was part of the A class of lifeboats formerly operated by the Royal National Lifeboat Institution of the United Kingdom and Ireland. It was replaced by the Atlantic 21.

Fleet

References

External links
RNLI Fleet

Royal National Lifeboat Institution lifeboats